Gary Smith (born 12 August 1958) is a South African former cricketer. He played in nine first-class matches from 1979/80 to 1982/83.

References

External links
 

1958 births
Living people
South African cricketers
Border cricketers
KwaZulu-Natal cricketers
People from Queenstown, South Africa
Cricketers from the Eastern Cape